Irina Romanova (born 20 April 1972) is a Ukrainian former competitive ice dancer who competed for the Soviet Union before its dissolution and for Ukraine afterward. With Igor Yaroshenko, she is the 1996 European bronze medalist. They placed seventh at the 1994 Winter Olympics and ninth at the 1998 Winter Olympics. Their highest placement at the World Figure Skating Championships was fourth, in 1994. They were coached by Natalia Linichuk and Gennadi Karponosov. 

Romanova and Yaroshenko were married in 1991 and have a son, Nikita. Romanova now works as a coach and choreographer in Delaware.

Programs 
(with Yaroshenko)

Results 
(ice dance with Yaroshenko)

References 

 Skatabase: 1990s Europeans Results
 Skatabase: 1990s Worlds Results
 Skatabase: 1990s Olympics Results

External links 
 Care to Ice Dance: Romanova & Yaroshenko
 Coaching information

Ukrainian female ice dancers
Soviet female ice dancers
Olympic figure skaters of Ukraine
Figure skaters at the 1994 Winter Olympics
Figure skaters at the 1998 Winter Olympics
Living people
Sportspeople from Odesa
1972 births
European Figure Skating Championships medalists
Universiade medalists in figure skating
Goodwill Games medalists in figure skating
Universiade silver medalists for the Soviet Union
Competitors at the 1991 Winter Universiade
Competitors at the 1994 Goodwill Games
Figure skating choreographers